Mycena sublucens is a species of agaric fungus in the family Mycenaceae. Found in Indonesia, it was described as new to science in 1954 by English mycologist E. J. H. Corner. The fruit bodies are bioluminescent.

See also
List of bioluminescent fungi

References

External links

sublucens
Bioluminescent fungi
Fungi described in 1954
Fungi of Asia